New Mother is the debut studio album by American folk music act Angels of Light. It was released on April 5, 1999 via frontman Michael Gira's own record label Young God Records, immediately after Michael Gira disbanded his previous band, Swans. The album features contributions from various musicians, including violinist Hahn Rowe, Rasputina band cellist Julia Kent, drummer Thor Harris, composer Joe McGinty and ex-Swans members Bill Rieflin, Phil Puleo and Bill Bronson.

The album contains versions of some songs that were performed live during Swans final tour, including "The Man With the Silver Tongue" and "Not Alone". The Michael Gira solo album Solo Recording at Home contains an outtake from the recordings session for this album, on the song "God's Servant".

Critical reception
Ned Raggett of Allmusic gave the album a positive review, stating: "No less than 19 musicians participated in the creation of New Mother, and the fact that Gira was able to synthesize their efforts and create such a powerful debut bodes well for his future efforts in this vein." He also wrote that the record "draws on a juxtaposition of lush '60s American and European pop orchestration." Jordan N. Mamone of CMJ also praised the album, writing: "While many of the Swans' attempts at levity sounded forced and gothic, the Angels of Light shine naturally, with poise and stunning clarity." He subsequently included the album in his "Top Ten Picks" list.

Track listing

Personnel
Angels of Light
Michael Gira – vocals, composition, production, acoustic guitar, electric guitar

Additional musicians
Bill Rieflin – piano, bass guitar, Farfisa organ, B3 organ, analog synthesizer, acoustic guitar, backingvocals
Christoph Hahn – lap steel, classical and electric guitar, Casio organ, backing vocals
Larry Mullins – vibraphone, timpani, tabla, percussion, backing vocals
Thor Harris – hand drums, percussion, glockenspiel, backing vocals, water bowls
Phil Puleo – percussion, melodica, organ, mouth harp
Julia Kent – cello
Bill Bronson – bass guitar 
Joe McGinty – upright piano
Michele Amar – backing vocals
Hahn Rowe – violin
Birgit Staudt – accordion
Thomas Dodd – Irish harp 
Martin Bisi – organ, backing vocals, engineering, mixing
Chris Griffin – banjo, dobro, dulcimer, mandolin
 
Other personnel
Hillary Johnson – assistant engineering, engineering
Michael Moore – engineering

Chart positions

References

External links
 New Mother on Young God Records

1999 debut albums
Angels of Light albums
Young God Records albums
Albums produced by Michael Gira